Candyass is the debut album by American industrial rock band Orgy. It was released on August 18, 1998.

Track listing

Singles 
 "Blue Monday" release date: February 9, 1999
 "Stitches" release date: November 23, 1999

Personnel 
 Jay Gordon – vocals, programming, additional synthesizers
 Ryan Shuck – rhythm guitar
 Amir Derakh – lead guitar, additional engineering
 Paige Haley – bass
 Bobby Hewitt – drums
 Chad Fridirici – engineering, mixing on "Gender", pro-tool editing
 Josh Abraham – production, additional engineering, programming, additional synthesizers
 Dave Ogilvie – mixing
 David Kahne – mixing on "Stiches", "Fetisha"
 Jay Baumgardner – mixing on "Pantomime"
 Tom Baker – mastering
 Brian Virtue – assistant engineer
 Cope Till – assistant engineer
 Doug Trantow – assistant engineer
 Anthony Valcic – programming
 Jonathan Davis – additional vocals on "Revival"
 Elijah Blue Allman – additional vocals on "Revival", additional synthesizers
 Troy Van Leeuwen – additional guitars on "Social Enemies" and "Dissention"
 Steve Gerdes – art direction, design
 Joseph Cultice – photography

Charts

Weekly charts

Year-end charts

Certifications

Notes

References 

Orgy (band) albums
1998 debut albums
Reprise Records albums
Warner Records albums
Albums produced by Josh Abraham